Gaëlle Blouin  (born 14 August 1972 in Nantes) is a French footballer who played as a midfielder for the France women's national football team. She was part of the team at the UEFA Women's Euro 2001. On club level she plays for Toulouse FC in France.

References

External links
 
 

1972 births
Living people
French women's footballers
France women's international footballers
Footballers from Nantes
Women's association football midfielders